The Florida Board of Education, also known as the State Board of Education (SBE), is a committee composed of members appointed by the Florida governor to guide and direct the public K-12, community college and state college education in the U.S. state of Florida.

History 
From Reconstruction through 2002, the commissioner of education had been a Cabinet-level position, elected by the people and directly responsible for public education in Florida. The 1998 Constitutional Revision Commission proposed a rewrite of Article IV, Section IV of the Florida Constitution that reduced the Florida Cabinet from six elected officials to three.  The voters approved the changes and it became effective January 7, 2003. The Florida commissioner of education became an appointed position and the Florida Department of Education became the overall responsibility of the governor. The revised constitution also created a new Florida Board of Education with seven members (one of whom is the commissioner of education), appointed by the governor. The Florida commissioner of education manages the day-to-day operations of the FLDOE. The current commissioner is Richard Corcoran, appointed in 2018.

Mission 
According to the Board's website, their mission is to:

Members

Meetings
The Florida Board of Education meets at least bi-monthly in Tallahassee; more often if issues require it. Public hearings are also held periodically at locations throughout the state.

Rulings 
In 2021 the Florida Board of Education prohibited teaching about critical race theory or the 1619 Project in public schools.

Former members

See also 

 Florida Department of Education

 State University System

 Florida College System

References

External links 

 Florida Department of Education website

Board of Education
Government of Florida
Florida
2003 establishments in Florida